Antonio Gómez Rufo professionally known simply as Gómez Rufo (born 1954 in Madrid) is a Spanish writer

Gómez achieved a law degree at the Complutense University of Madrid, he graduated in 1977 and between 1979 and 1983 he worked as a lawyer. In 1984 he began working as a screenwriter and poet for books. His debut was in 1984 when he wrote his first book entitled El último goliardo. He wrote the screenplay for the 1999 film París Tombuctú (which starred Michel Piccoli).

In 2005 Gómez won the Fernando Lara Novel Award for El secreto del rey cautivo.

Books
 El último goliardo (1984)
 Natalia (1988)
 El carnaval perpetuo (1992)
 Aguas tranquilas, aguas profundas (1992)
 Crónica de nadie (1992)
 El Club de los Osos Traviesos (1993)
 La leyenda del falso traidor (1994)
 Un gato en el desván (1995)
 Las lágrimas de Henan (1996)
 Si tú supieras (1997)
 El desfile de la victoria (1999)
 El alma de los peces (2001)
 Los mares del miedo (2002)
 Adiós a los hombres (2004)
 El secreto del rey cautivo (2005)
 El señor de Cheshire (2006)
 Balada triste en Madrid (2006)
 La noche del tamarindo (2008)
 La abadía de los crímenes (2011)
 La más bella historia de amor de Paula Cortázar (2012)

References

External links
Página oficial de Antonio Gómez Rufo

1954 births
Living people
Writers from Madrid
Spanish male screenwriters
Spanish reporters and correspondents
Complutense University of Madrid alumni